Purbasthali Uttar Assembly constituency is an assembly constituency in Purba Bardhaman district in the Indian state of West Bengal.

Overview
As per orders of the Delimitation Commission, No. 269 Purbasthali Uttar Assembly constituency covers Purbasthali II community development block, Jahannagar and Dogachia gram panchayats of Purbasthali I CD Block, and Bamunpara, Mamudpur II and Putsuri gram panchayats of Manteswar CD Block.

As per orders of Delimitation Commission, Purbasthali Uttar Assembly constituency is part of No. 38 Bardhaman Purba (Lok Sabha constituency).

Members of Legislative Assembly

Election results

2021

2016

 

.# Swing calculated on Trinamool Congress+Congress vote percentages taken together and CPI(M) vote percentages in 2011, in Purbasthali Uttar constituency.

2011

 

.# Swing calculated on Trinamool Congress+Congress vote percentages taken together and CPI(M) vote percentages in 2006, in Purbasthali constituency.

References

Politics of Paschim Bardhaman district
Assembly constituencies of West Bengal
Politics of Purba Bardhaman district